Miraumont is a commune in the Somme department in Hauts-de-France in northern France.

Current agricultural products include grains, potatoes, and beets.

Geography
Miraumont is located at the source of the river Ancre, the third longest tributary of the Somme.

The railway station at Miraumont is between the station at Achiet, near Bapaume, and the station at Albert, the administrative center of the canton.

History
The theatre of operations for the Battle of Bapaume (1871) during the  Franco-Prussian War of 1870–1871.

The village was completely destroyed between 1914 and 1918 during the First World War.

Population

See also
Communes of the Somme department

References

Communes of Somme (department)